Peter Tierney Murrell (born 8 December 1964) is a former chief executive of the Scottish National Party (SNP). He is married to Nicola Sturgeon, the outgoing leader of the SNP and First Minister of Scotland.

Early life and education 
Murrell was born in Edinburgh on 8 December 1964. He attended Craigmount High School and studied at the University of Glasgow.

Career 
Murrell replaced Michael Russell as chief executive of the Scottish National Party (SNP) in 1999. He had previously worked in the Banff and Buchan constituency office of Alex Salmond, the former party leader. The party's success in the 2007 elections was credited to the organisation of Murrell.

Murrell was formerly the company secretary of Independence Merchandising Limited, a now-dissolved company that included as its directors SNP politicians Pete Wishart and Stewart Stevenson.

In January 2019 Murrell came under pressure to resign from Kenny MacAskill, former SNP Justice Secretary.

Following his testimony to the Committee on the Scottish Government Handling of Harassment Complaints in December 2020, Murrell was reported to the Lord Advocate by committee member Murdo Fraser, who alleged Murrell had made a "false statement" under oath while giving evidence. Murrell said he "absolutely refuted” the allegation.

Murrell is facing questions from party members over the alleged disappearance of £600,000 in donations to the party.  Police in Scotland are currently investigating an allegation of fraud with regards to the missing £600,000. The Scotsman reported in June 2021 that Police Scotland had been asked to investigate Murrell regarding a donation to SNP from lottery winners Colin and Christine Weir, which they subsequently asked to be returned to them.

Murrell has also faced questions from the Scottish Labour and Conservative parties over a £107,620 interest-free loan made to the SNP on 20 June 2021, that was not declared to the Electoral Commission for more than a year after the July 2021 deadline. The SNP stated that it did not declare the loan as it did not think the matter was reportable.  The loan was to assist with cashflow problems at the party.

When his wife, Nicola Sturgeon, announced her resignation as first minister on 15 February 2023, Joanna Cherry, an SNP MP, called for Murrell to step down as CEO of the party stating "The SNP Leadership & party management have been deeply bound together. I cannot see any circumstances in which Peter Murrell can continue as Chief Executive under a new leader who must be free to choose a successor."

During the leadership election, the SNP came under pressure to reveal the size of its membership. The party’s national executive committee agreed to publish the figure, which was 72,186 as of 15 February 2023, down from 104,000 members in 2021. There had been prior media reports that the party's membership had dropped around 30,000. Murray Foote, the SNP’s media chief, had described these reports as “inaccurate” and “drivel”. In response to the confirmation of the numbers, he said he had been “acting in good faith” with earlier comments, but resigned his position. This then led to the SNP's national executive committee giving Murrell an ultimatum as he was blamed for Foote having been misinformed. Murrell resigned as SNP Chief Executive "with immediate effect" on 18 March 2023 ahead of a vote of no-confidence. In a statement, Murrell said: "Responsibility for the SNP's responses to media queries about our membership number lies with me as chief executive. While there was no intent to mislead, I accept that this has been the outcome. I have therefore decided to confirm my intention to step down as chief executive with immediate effect."

Personal life 
Murrell married Nicola Sturgeon in July 2010 at Òran Mór Glasgow. They first met in 1988 when Sturgeon, who volunteered at the Banff and Buchan constituency office of Alex Salmond, attended an SNP youth camp organised by Murrell. Sturgeon and Murrell became a couple in 2003.

References 

1964 births
Scottish people of Irish descent
Living people
Scottish chief executives
Leaders of the Scottish National Party
Alumni of the University of Glasgow
Nicola Sturgeon
Businesspeople from Edinburgh
People educated at Craigmount High School
Spouses of British politicians